William Whiteley  (3 October 1882 – 3 November 1955) was the Labour Member of Parliament (MP) for Blaydon in County Durham.

William Whiteley, not to be confused with the founder of the Department Store of the same name, was a Durham miner by background and a lodge official.  He was an active trade unionist and member of the Labour Party.

He stood unsuccessfully in Blaydon for Labour in the 1918 general election, but was successful in the election four years later.  He went on to be the MP for Blaydon from 1922 to 1931. His defeat in the 1931 general election followed the events of that summer when Ramsay MacDonald quit the Labour Party to form a National Government and the election called in October that year reduced the Labour representation to a rump of 52 MPs.  However Whiteley was re-elected at the 1935 general election and went on to represent the constituency for the next twenty years until his death in 1955 at the age of 74.  In the consequent by-election, the seat was held for Labour by Robert Woof.

President of the Durham Miners' Homes for the Aged 1927 – 1955, Whiteley became a Privy Councillor after 1943 and was Labour Chief Whip in the House of Commons for thirteen years. During the government of Clement Attlee of 1945 – 1951 was Parliamentary Secretary to the Treasury.

References

External links 

1882 births
1955 deaths
Deputy Lieutenants of Durham
Labour Party (UK) MPs for English constituencies
Members of the Order of the Companions of Honour
Members of the Privy Council of the United Kingdom
Miners' Federation of Great Britain-sponsored MPs
Ministers in the Churchill wartime government, 1940–1945
National Union of Mineworkers-sponsored MPs
UK MPs 1922–1923
UK MPs 1923–1924
UK MPs 1924–1929
UK MPs 1929–1931
UK MPs 1935–1945
UK MPs 1945–1950
UK MPs 1950–1951
UK MPs 1951–1955
UK MPs 1955–1959
Ministers in the Attlee governments, 1945–1951